Laar is a hamlet in the Dutch province of North Brabant. It is located in the municipality of Vught, 2 km west of the town of Helvoirt.

References

Populated places in North Brabant
Vught